Cymindis ovipennis is a species of ground beetle in the subfamily Harpalinae. It was described by Victor Motschulsky in 1944.

References

ovipennis
Beetles described in 1944